Erich Pasch (sometimes listed as Hans-Erich Pasch, born 8 November 1946) is a West German sprint canoeist who competed in the 1970s. He won silver medals at the ICF Canoe Sprint World Championships (K-1 10000 m: 1975, K-4 1000 m: 1971, K-4 10000 m: 1973).

Pasch competed in two Summer Olympics, earning his best finish of fifth in the K-4 1000 m event at Munich in 1972.

References
 
 
 

1946 births
Canoeists at the 1972 Summer Olympics
Canoeists at the 1976 Summer Olympics
German male canoeists
Living people
Olympic canoeists of West Germany
ICF Canoe Sprint World Championships medalists in kayak